Falsochrobactrum ovis is a Gram-negative, rod-shaped, non-spore-forming and non-motile bacterium from the genus of Falsochrobactrum which has been isolated from the placenta of a sheep.

References

Hyphomicrobiales
Bacteria described in 2013